The Klokova Tunnel is a tunnel on the Ionia Motorway, western Greece. It is built in order for the new motorway to bypass the Klokova mountain, which, until recently, was traversed by the narrow Greek National Road 5. Works began in March 2015 and were completed with the opening of the tunnel on 12 April 2017.

References

Aetolia-Acarnania
Road tunnels in Greece
Buildings and structures in Aetolia-Acarnania